Jules Mascaron (1634–1703) was a popular French preacher. He was born in Marseille as the son of a barrister at Aix-en-Provence. He entered the Oratory of Jesus early and became reputed as a preacher. Paris confirmed the judgment of the provinces; in 1666 he was asked to preach before the court and became a favourite of Louis XIV, who said that his eloquence was one of the few things that never grew old.

In 1671, he was appointed the bishop of Tulle; eight years later he was transferred to the larger diocese of Agen. He still continued to preach regularly at court, especially for funeral orations. A panegyric on Turenne, delivered in 1675, is considered to be his masterpiece. His style is strongly tinged with préciosité and his chief surviving interest is as a glaring example of the evils from which Jacques-Bénigne Bossuet delivered the French pulpit.

During his later years, he devoted himself entirely to his pastoral duties at Agen where he died in 1703.

Six of his most famous sermons were edited, with a biographical sketch of their author, by the Oratorian Borde in 1704.

References

One his most famous books - that went into several editions - had been: La Mort et les Dernieres Paroles de Seneque Lyon, 1653. A critical quote concerning Girolamo Cardano's book praising Nero has been placed into: Nero: An Exemplary Life by Inkstone, 2012.

1634 births
1703 deaths
Roman Catholic clergy from Marseille
French Oratory
Bishops of Agen
Bishops of Tulle